Wreckless: The Yakuza Missions (Double S.T.E.A.L. in Japan) is a 2002 racing video game originally released on the Xbox and later for GameCube and PlayStation 2. The game is set in Hong Kong, in which the player completes missions.

The game was specifically developed for Xbox rather than being a port and was well-received. The GameCube and PlayStation 2 versions suffered from performance issues and did not sell well. In 2005, a Japan-only sequel was released for the Xbox called Double S.T.E.A.L. The Second Clash.

Plot 
Set in Hong Kong, the player plays as either part of a corrupt police unit attempting to crack down on rival Yakuza operations, or as a pair of spies hired to take down Tiger Takagi, the head of the Hong Kong Yakuza.

Reception 

According to Metacritic, the Xbox version of Wreckless received "mixed or average reviews", with a score of 74/100 based on 36 reviews. The PlayStation 2 and GameCube versions fared worse but still fell in the "mixed or average reviews" category, with respective scores of 60/100 and 58/100.

Wreckless: The Yakuza Mission was nominated for GameSpots 2002 "Best Graphics (Technical) on Xbox" award, which went to Tom Clancy's Splinter Cell.

References

External links 

2002 video games
Activision games
GameCube games
Organized crime video games
PlayStation 2 games
Racing video games
Xbox games
Video games about police officers
Video games developed in Japan
Video games scored by BT (musician)
Video games set in Hong Kong
Works about the Yakuza